Howard Griffiths may refer to:

Howard Griffiths (conductor) (born 1950), British conductor
Howard Griffiths (scientist), British plant scientist
Howard Griffiths (presenter), British television presenter
Howard Griffiths (screenwriter) (1935–1999), Welsh-born screenwriter for Australian television shows

See also
Howard Griffith (born 1967), American football player
Morgan Griffith (Howard Morgan Griffith, born March 15, 1958), American politician